This list of museums in Pittsburgh, Pennsylvania encompasses museums defined for this context as institutions (including nonprofit organizations, government entities, and private businesses) that collect and care for objects of cultural, artistic, scientific, or historical interest and make their collections or related exhibits available for public viewing. Also included are university and non-profit art galleries.  Museums that exist only in cyberspace (i.e., virtual museums) are not included.

Museums

References

 Visit Pittsburgh: History Museums
 Visit Pittsburgh: Visual Art

 
Museums
Pittsburgh
Pennsylvania education-related lists